Boxing at the 2013 World Combat Games was held at the Yubileiny - Sports Complex 'Yubileiny' Hall 1 in Saint Petersburg, Russia. Preliminary rounds took place on the 20 and 22 October 2013. All the medals have been decided on the 24 October 2013.

Medal table
Key:

Medal summary

Men

Women

References

External links
Results

2013 World Combat Games
2013 World Combat Games events
2013 in boxing